Willman 1 is an ultra low-luminosity dwarf galaxy or a star cluster. Willman 1 was discovered in 2004. It is named after Beth Willman of Haverford College, the lead author of a study based on the Sloan Digital Sky Survey data. The object is a satellite of the Milky Way, at ~120,000 light-years away. Willman 1 has an elliptical shape with the half-light radius of about 25 pc. Its heliocentric velocity is approximately −13 km/s.

As of 2007, it was declared the least massive galaxy known, opening up a new category of ultra-low-mass galaxies, lower than the then-theoretical minimum of 10 million solar masses thought to be needed to form a galaxy.

As of 2016, it is the third dimmest likely galaxy known, after Segue 1 and Virgo I, and is over ten million times less luminous than the Milky Way. Observations indicate its mass is about 0.4 million solar masses, which means that Willman's 1 mass to light ratio is around 800. A high mass to light ratio implies that Willman 1 is dominated by dark matter. It is difficult, however, to estimate the mass of such faint objects because any mass estimate is based on an implicit assumption that an object is gravitationally bound, which may not be true if the object is in a process of disruption.

The stellar population of Willman 1 consists mainly of old stars formed more than 10 billion years ago.

Notes 

 a. 15.2 ± 0.4 apparent magnitude − 5 * (log10(38 ± 7 kpc distance) − 1) = −2.7 absolute magnitude

References
Inline

General

 

 
 

Dwarf galaxies
Dwarf spheroidal galaxies
Globular clusters
Local Group
Milky Way Subgroup
?
Ursa Major (constellation)